Bruno Dita (born 18 February 1993) is an Albanian professional footballer who plays as a midfielder for the Macedonian club Shkëndija.

Club career

Teuta Durrës
In June 2014, Dita signed with Teuta Durrës for an undisclosed fee, and was assigned number 22 for the 2014–15 season. He made his debut with the club on 23 August 2014, appearing as a second-half substitute in team's opening match of the season, a 2–1 away defeat to Flamurtari Vlorë.

Dita made his 100th top flight appearance on 13 December 2015 in the 0–1 home loss to Skënderbeu Korçë in the 2015–16 Albanian Superliga matchday 16.

On 21 February 2016, Dita scored his first career brace, including a 97th minute-winner against the newcomers of Tërbuni Pukë, helping his side to reduce the gap with Tirana for the "European spot". He dedicated the goals to his sister and girlfriend, adding that the win was important for the team's progress.

On 31 May 2017, following the end of 2016–17 season where Teuta barely avoided relegation, Dita decided to leave the club along with several other players, confirming that he was not going to be part of the team for the next season.

Skënderbeu Korçë
On 5 June 2017, Dita completed a transfer to fellow Albanian Superliga side Skënderbeu Korçë by signing a two-year contract. He made his league debut for the club on 23 September 2017 in a 2-0 home victory over FK Partizani Tirana. He was subbed on in the 73rd minute, replacing Gjergji Muzaka. He scored his first league goal for the club on 2 October 2017 in a 2-1 away victory over FK Kukësi. His goal, the first of the match, came in the 31st minute.

Career statistics

References

External links

Instagram: https://instagram.com/bruno_dita

1993 births
Living people
Footballers from Tirana
Albanian footballers
Albania under-21 international footballers
Albania youth international footballers
Association football midfielders
FK Dinamo Tirana players
Besa Kavajë players
KF Teuta Durrës players
KF Skënderbeu Korçë players
Kategoria Superiore players